Meloetyphlus fuscatus, the blind blister beetle, is a species of blister beetle in the family Meloidae found in Central and South America. They are kleptoparasites of orchid bees and are entirely blind as adults. Unique among meloids, females do not lay their eggs near flowers, but rather within their hosts' nests.

Description and etymology

Description 
M. fuscatus is a blind, dull, and robust blister beetle. The eyeless head is larger than is typical for blister beetles and provides more attachment area for mandibular muscles (this head shape is only observed once elsewhere in Meloidae, in the tribe Horiini). Length ranges from 12 to 17mm; males are typically larger and have more strongly modified legs than females.

Etymology 
The generic and specific names derive from Meloe + Greek τῠφλός (tuphlós) for blind, and Latin fusco for dusky.

Range and habitat

Range 

To date, M. fuscatus has been recorded in:

 Honduras: Francisco Morazán
Costa Rica: Limón, San José
 Colombia: Caldas, Cundinamarca
 Ecuador: Bolívar
 Trinidad
 Peru: Loreto
 Brazil: Pernambuco, São Paulo

Habitat 
Adults are found in, on, or vicinal to their host's nest. Triungulins are found in their host's nest or on the host.

Life history

Host species 

M. fuscatus is a kleptoparasite of three orchid bee genera: Eufriesea, Eulaema, and Exaerete
 
Known host species:

Life cycle 
The life cycle of M. fuscatus begins when an adult female oviposits in an empty cell of its host's nest. The triungulins hatch within 20 day after oviposition and immediately set off looking for a provisioned bee nest to parasitize. This can be accomplished by attaching to a female bee to gain access to her nest. If a female emerges in a cell near that of  the triungulins, they will attach to her. But in the instance of a male emerging near the triungulins, they will attach to him and transfer to a female during mating. Once a triungulin has infiltrated an active nest cell and the cell is sealed off, it will proceed to eat the bee egg and pollen privisions of that cell. After the triungulin pupates, it uses its strongly modified forelegs and mandibles to dig out of the sealed cell and look for a mate. Adult M. fuscatus do not feed, and the fecundity of females is determined by the amount of nutrition consumed as an immature.

References 

Wikipedia Student Program
Meloidae
Beetles described in 1872
Beetles of South America